WaterColor is an unincorporated master-planned community located in Seagrove Beach on the Northwest Gulf Coast of Florida, United States near Destin. This  Southern resort and residential community was planned by Cooper, Robertson & Partners with Urban Design Associates, in collaboration with Nelson Byrd Woltz Landscape Architects, under the direction of The St. Joe Company. The St. Joe Company has owned the land since 1927. WaterColor is located in Walton County.

WaterColor homes are based on the vernacular architecture of Southern wood homes with features that include large wraparound or screened porches, wood columns and siding and a metal roof with deep overhangs. Community amenities include a swimming pool, fitness center, tennis courts, parks and gardens, shopping and restaurants. Camp Creek Golf Club is available to homeowners for an annual fee.

The WaterColor Inn is a 60-room beachfront resort designed by David Rockwell.  In 2006 it was rated the #1 Family Friendly Resort in North America by Travel + Leisure magazine.  It is the only four diamond hotel in Northwest Florida.  The Inn and Vacation Rentals are managed by Troon Golf and St. Joe Clubs and Resorts as of January 2014.

See also
Celebration, Florida
Prospect New Town
Rosemary Beach, Florida
Seaside, Florida
Tradition, Florida

References

External links
WaterColor website
St. Joe Company website
St. Joe Clubs and Resorts
WaterColor project profile at Nelson Byrd Woltz

Vernacular architecture in Florida
Populated coastal places in Florida on the Gulf of Mexico
Planned communities in Florida
New Urbanism communities